Testicular self-examination (TSE) is a procedure where a man examines his own testicles and scrotum for possible lumps or swelling. It is usually undertaken at home while standing in front of a mirror and after having a warm bath or shower. Monthly self-examination of the testicles starting at puberty may be an effective way of detecting testicular cancer at an early, potentially treatable stage, which can lead to a 5-year survival rate of 98%. In men aged 15 to 40, testicular cancer is the most common cancer, and the annual rate of increase over the last 10 years in cases of testicular cancer has been shown to be approximately 1% each year. Testicular cancer typically presents with a painless testicular swelling or lump or any change in shape or texture of the testicles.

TSE is also indicated if there are certain risk factors present, such as a family history of testicular cancer. Additionally, outside of the possible early detection of testicular cancer, other "off label" uses of TSEs include detection of indirect inguinal hernias, varicocele, and infections that may affect the testicles, such as mumps. The efficacy of TSEs in detection of these pathologies relies on proper technique, but if done correctly, TSEs can be very beneficial to the health of the individual and have many public health benefits as well.

Uses
Monthly self-examination of the testicles, starting at puberty, may be an effective way of detecting testicular cancer at an early, and potentially treatable stage. Recommendations vary with some physicians recommending the use of monthly TSE for men ages 15 to 55.

Practitioners may recommend testicular self-exam (TSE) when the following risk factors are present:
 Family history of testicular cancer
 Past testicular tumor
 Undescended testicle
 Testicular atrophy

Professional Guidelines
There is no general medical consensus for recommendations on TSE. The effectiveness of performing TSE in reducing morbidity and mortality from testicular cancer is not known. Not all organizations endorse the procedure as a screening test, arguing that it may lead to unnecessary treatments, and unnecessary anxiety.  The benefit of TSE is uncertain due to there being no randomized control trial studying the use of TSE. Many organizations have established their own guidelines in regard to the utilization of testicular self examination as well as the use of testicular examination by a medical provider as a diagnostic tool. These guidelines can be found in the table below.

Technique 
For men who choose to perform TSE, it is recommended to perform TSE once monthly, at approximately the same time every month. Performing TSE during or after a warm bath or shower may help to relax the skin of the scrotum and make the structures within the scrotum easier to feel.

Existing guidelines indicate that TSE is best performed in the standing position. Individuals performing TSE may choose to stand in front of a mirror in order to visualize the scrotum and testicles from various angles. First, the scrotum and testicles may be visually examined for any skin changes or visible swelling. Then, with the thumb placed on the upper surface and the index and middle finger placed on the lower surface, each testicle can be rolled between the thumb and fingers to feel for potential findings. It is also recommended to locate and feel the epididymis, a soft, rope- or tube-like structure that runs behind each testicle, in order to avoid confusing this structure for a potentially abnormal finding.

Findings
Normal findings during TSE include testicles that feel round, smooth, and homogenous in texture, and that are mobile within the scrotum. It is normal and common for one testicle to be larger and hang lower in the scrotum than the other.

Findings that may be abnormal and should be discussed with healthcare providers include:
 Pain or tenderness to touch
 Firm lumps
 Swelling or fluid buildup
 Changes in testicular size or the relative size of both testicles, compared to the individual’s baseline

Limitations
The effectiveness of performing routine TSE in men without symptoms in reducing morbidity and mortality from testicular cancer is not clear, and as such, not all organizations endorse the procedure as a screening test, arguing that it may lead to unnecessary treatments. Additionally, some signs and symptoms of testicular cancer found during TSE are common to other disorders of the male urinary tract and reproductive organs, including hydrocele testis, spermatocele, genitourinary system cancers, urinary tract infections, sexually transmitted infections, or testicular torsion, which may prompt medical attention to preserve reproductive and urinary function. These potential false positives may cause unnecessary concern or anxiety to patients.

Society and culture
Testicular self-examination has generally low rates of practice in part because young men have very low rates of health-seeking behaviors, leading to higher rates of mortality and morbidity. This is likely influenced by the fact that men face potential perceived societal pressures and judgement, which create obstacles to these patients seeking care.

See also 
 Breast self-examination
 Well-woman examination

References

External links 
 Testicular Cancer. Orchid (2015)
 Testicular self-examination. WebMD

Male genital procedures
Testicle disorders
Men's health